Ectoedemia luisae is a moth of the family Nepticulidae. It is found in Turkey.

The larvae feed on Hypericum calycinum. They mine the leaves of their host plant. The mine consists of a thin and tortuous corridor that is almost entirely filled with frass. The corridor widens into a blotch. Here the frass is found in the centre. Pupation takes place in a silken cocoon within the mine, that causes the mine to bulge somewhat. The cocoon is connected by a silken tube to the spot in the lower epidermis where the imago is to appear.

External links
Fauna Europaea
bladmineerders.nl

Nepticulidae
Endemic fauna of Turkey
Moths described in 1978
Moths of Asia